Xylocopa olivacea is a species of carpenter bee. It has a completely yellow thorax and a yellow band on the first tergite. This species is very similar to X. calens, endemic to Madagascar. X. calens just differs in the length of the hair on the metasoma.

This species can be found in Senegal, Sierra Leone, Togo, Nigeria, Cameroon, the Democratic Republic of the Congo, Ethiopia, Tanzania, Mozambique, Malawi, Angola, and South Africa.

References

Further reading
Eardley, C. D. (1987) Catalogue of Apoidea (Hymenoptera) in Africa south of the Sahara, Part 1, The genus Xylocopa Latreille (Anthophoridae), Entomology Memoir, No. 70

olivacea
Insects described in 1778